El Chapo is a crime television series, co-produced by Netflix and Univision, about the life of Joaquín "El Chapo" Guzmán. The series premiered on April 23, 2017 on Univision before airing on Netflix worldwide. It stars Marco de la O as the title character.

The series recounts the beginnings of Joaquín "El Chapo" Guzmán in 1985, when he was a low-level member of the Guadalajara Cartel, his rise to power as head of the Sinaloa Cartel, and his downfall.

On May 12, 2017, Univision confirmed that the series would be renewed for a second season. Season 2 premiered on September 17, 2017.

Netflix released the first season, comprising nine episodes, on June 16, 2017. The second season was released on December 15, 2017.

The third season premiered on July 9, 2018 on Univision, and on July 27, 2018 on Netflix.

Cast

Main cast
 Marco de la O as Joaquín "El Chapo" Guzmán 
 Humberto Busto as Conrado Higuera Sol "Don Sol" (a fictionalized portrayal of Genaro García Luna)
 Alejandro Aguilar as Toño  Antonio Mendoza Cruz (alias El primo Tony)
 Rodrigo Abed as Amado Carrillo Fuentes (alias "El Señor de los Cielos")
 Luis Fernando Peña as Armando "Rayo" López
 Juan Carlos Olivas as Héctor Luis Palma Salazar (alias "El Güero")
 Antonio de la Vega as Arturo Bernal Leyda  (a fictionalized portrayal of Arturo Beltrán Leyva)
 Rolf Petersen as Ramón Avendaño (a fictionalized portrayal of Ramón Arellano Félix)
 Carlos Hernán Romo as Benjamín Avendaño (a fictionalized portrayal of Benjamín Arellano Félix)
 Héctor Holten as President Carlos Salinas de Gortari
 Diego Vásquez as Ismael Zambrano (a fictionalized portrayal of Ismael Zambada García (alias "El Mayo")
 Paul Choza as Chente (a fictionalized portrayal of Vicente Carrillo Fuentes (alias "El Viceroy”)
 Luis Rábago as General Roberto Blanco Macías
 Dolores Heredia as Gabriela Saavedra

Recurring cast
 Ricardo Lorenzana as Miguel Ángel Félix Gallardo (alias "El Padrino")
 Mauricio Mejía as Pablo Escobar
 Biassini Segura as "El Lobito" Avendaño (a fictionalized portrayal of Francisco Javier Arellano Félix, alias “El Tigrillo”) 
 Valentina Acosta as Alejandra (Alejandrina María Salazar Hernández)
 Juliette Pardau as Graciela (Griselda López Pérez)
 Laura Osma as Elba Coronado (a fictionalized portrayal of Emma Coronel Aispuro)
 Abril Schreiber as Guadalupe
 Hugo Gómez as Attorney Federico Livas 
 Joseph Fusezzy as Charles Pilliod (U.S. Ambassador)
 David Ojalvo as DEA Administrator John C. Lawn
 Ermis Cruz as Isidoro (a fictionalized portrayal of Fausto Isidro Meza Flores)
 Iván Aragón as Quino Guzmán (a fictionalized portrayal of Ivan Archivaldo Guzmán, alias “El Chapito”)
 Wilmer Cadavid as Dámaso Jiménez Gálvez  (a fictionalized portrayal of Damaso López  Núñez , alias “El Licenciado”)
 Carlos Sanchez as Mayel (a fictionalized portrayal of Vicente Zambada Niebla alias “El Vicentillo”)
 Camilo Amores as Arturo Guzmán Loera (alias "El Pollo") 
 Irán Castillo as Vanessa Espinoza (a fictionalized portrayal of Kate del Castillo)
 Marcela Mar as Berta (a fictionalized portrayal of Claudia Ruiz Massieu)
 Juan Pablo de Santiago as Franco
 Teté Espinoza as Chío

Episodes

Series overview

Season 1 (2017)

Season 2 (2017)

Season 3 (2018)

References

External links
 

2017 American television series debuts
2018 American television series endings
2010s American drama television series
Univision original programming
Spanish-language Netflix original programming
American biographical series
American crime television series
Television series about illegal drug trade
Television series about organized crime
Works about Mexican drug cartels